Roman Słowiński (born 16 March 1952) is a Polish computer scientist and professor. Since 2019 he has been Vice President of the Polish Academy of Sciences.

He is a Professor and Founding Chair of the Laboratory of Intelligent Decision Support Systems at the Institute of Computing Science, Poznań University of Technology, Poland. Since 2003 he is also a professor at the Systems Research Institute of the Polish Academy of Sciences in Warsaw.

His research focuses on the methodology and techniques of intelligent decision support, combining Operational Research and Artificial Intelligence.

He became a Corresponding Member of the Polish Academy of Sciences in 2004, and an Ordinary Member in 2013.

Education and employment 

Roman Słowiński was born in Poznań, Poland, on 16 March 1952 into the family of Lech Słowiński, a professor of Polish philology, and Melania née Michalska. He earned his undergraduate degree from the Electric Faculty of the Poznań University of Technology in 1974, followed by his doctorate (PhD) in 1977, his higher doctorate (DSc) in 1981. He attained the rank of professor in 1989, and since 2003 he has held the post of Full Professor at the Poznań University of Technology.

He became a Corresponding Member of the Polish Academy of Sciences in 2004, and an Ordinary Member in 2013. He became a Corresponding Member of the Polish Academy of Sciences in 2004, and an Ordinary Member in 2013. Since 2013 he has been a member of Academia Europaea. In 2011-2018 he held the post of Chairman of the Poznań Branch of the Polish Academy of Sciences. In 2015 he was elected Chairman of the Committee on Computer Science of the Polish Academy of Sciences.

In 2019 he was elected by the General Assembly of the Polish Academy of Sciences to the post of Vice President of the Academy for the 2019–22 term.

Other posts he has held include:

 Deputy Director of the Institute of Automatics, Poznań University of Technology (1984–87),
 Vice Dean of the Electric Faculty, Poznań University of Technology (1987–93),
 head of the Laboratory of Intelligent Decision Support Systems, Institute of Computing Science, Poznań University of Technology (since 1989),
 professeur en chaire européenne at Université Paris-Dauphine (2003–09),
 coordinator of the European Work Group for Multiple Criteria Decision Aiding, EURO – Association of European Operational Research Societies (since 2007);
 president (2010-2012) and fellow (since 2015) of the International Rough Set Society;
 fellow of IEEE (since 2009);
 expert panel member of the European Research Council, PE6-Computer Science (2009–13).

Research activity 

Roman Słowiński is a paradigm-creator in the field of intelligent decision support. He has authored or co-authored 14 books and more than 400 research articles, including more than 300 in major scientific journals listed by Journal Citation Reports (Web of Science h-index=45, Scopus h-index=56, Google Scholar h-index=82).  He has been the advisor for 26 PhD students, of whom 16 have themselves gone on to become professors. Aside from the Poznań University of Technology, he has also lectured at the Paris Dauphine University, École Centrale Paris, University of Catania, University of Osaka, Yokohama National University, University of Missouri, Laval University in Quebec and a number of others.

Since 1999 he has been the editor-in-chief of the European Journal of Operational Research . H 
Słowiński's research is on the topic of using rough sets in decision analysis. He started this work in 1983 with the founder of the rough set concept, the late Zdzisław Pawlak, and continued with Salvatore Greco and Benedetto Matarazzo since the early 1990s. He organized the First International Workshop on Rough Set Theory and Applications that took place in Poznań in 1992.

Non-scientific activity 

Since 2006 he has been a member of the Social Council to the Metropolitan Archbishop of Poznań; in 2006-2010 he was a board member of the Polish section of the Aid to the Church in Need organization.

Awards and distinctions 

Prof. Słowiński has been decorated with the following awards and distinctions:

 the EURO Gold Medal (European Association of Operational Research Societies) – 1991 
 the Golden Cross of Merit (1994) 
 the F. Edgeworth and V. Pareto Award of the International Society on Multiple Criteria Decision Making, Cape Town (1997) 
 the Knight's Cross (2001) and Officer's Cross (2012) of the Polonia Restituta Order 
 the title of "Outstanding Personage of Organic Work" (2017) from the Hipolit Cegielski Society (named after the 19th-century Polish positivist Hipolit Cegielski)  
 the title of "Distinguished Citizen of the City of Poznań" (2018) from the City Council of Poznań
 IRSS Fellow (International Rough Set Society) – 2015 
 IEEE Fellow (The Institute of Electrical and Electronics Engineers) – 2017 
 INFORMS Fellow (Institute for Operations Research and the Management Sciences) – 2019
 IFIP Fellow (International Federation for Information Processing) – 2020

He holds honorary doctorates from three foreign universities: the Polytechnic Faulty of Mons (Belgium, 2000), Paris Dauphine University (France, 2001) and the Technical University of Crete in Chania (Greece, 2008).: He is also a Honorary Professor of the Nanjing University of Aeronautics and Astronautics (2018).

References 

Members of the Polish Academy of Sciences
Fellows of the Institute for Operations Research and the Management Sciences
Polish computer scientists
Poznań University of Technology alumni
1952 births
Living people
Academic staff of the Poznań University of Technology